Michaela Washington (born February 27, 1966) is a former professional tennis player from the United States.

Biography
The eldest sibling of a tennis playing family, Washington grew up in the state of Michigan. Both of her brothers, MaliVai and Mashiska, played on the ATP Tour. One of her two younger sisters, Mashona, also played tennis professionally.

In 1981 she won the USTA Amateur Championships.

Washington played briefly on the professional tour, in 1984 and 1985. Her most notable performance came at the 1984 Central Fidelity Banks International, where she was a losing finalist in the singles competition. She made the main draw of a grand slam tournament for the first time at the 1984 Australian Open, then appeared at both the French Open and Wimbledon in 1985. At Wimbledon she was beaten in the first round by fourth seed Manuela Maleeva. She retired young as a result of a wrist injury.

WTA Tour finals

Singles (0-1)

References

External links
 
 

1966 births
Living people
American female tennis players
Tennis people from Michigan
Sportspeople from Flint, Michigan
African-American female tennis players
21st-century African-American people
21st-century African-American women
20th-century African-American sportspeople
20th-century African-American women